The Far Eastern Memorial Hospital (FEMH) is a hospital in Banqiao District, New Taipei, Taiwan.

History
The hospital was established on 1 April 1981. In 1985, the hospital became a secondary teaching hospital after it was accredited by the Ministry of Education. In 1988, it became a district hospital. In 1991, it became a district and teaching hospital. In 2000, it became a district and class II teaching hospital. In 2009, it was accredited to be a medical center.

On 17 May 2021, the hospital reported 7 new domestic COVID-19 cases.

Transportation
The hospital is accessible from Far Eastern Hospital Station of Taipei Metro.

See also
 List of hospitals in Taiwan

References

External links

 

1981 establishments in Taiwan
Banqiao District
Hospitals established in 1981
Hospitals in New Taipei